Murray Carter (born 30 January 1931 in Melbourne) is an Australian racing driver. For many years a stalwart of the Australian Touring Car Championship Carter has had one of the longest racing careers of any driver in Australian history, continuing to race into his 80s.

Racing history
One of a generation of racing drivers that appeared in the 1950s as tyres and fuel, rationed for most of that decade in the post-war economic climate, became more widely available. After racing motorcycles and a Jaguar XK120, Carter built an open wheeler which was powered by a Chevrolet Corvette V8 engine, the car making its first appearance in 1959. The following year the car was rebuilt as a sports car and subsequently as a "GT" car, becoming part of the brief history of Appendix K, a uniquely Australian category for closed cars with no required production origins. Carter finished runner up in the 1963 Australian GT Championship behind Bob Jane. He also embraced production car racing when it emerged in 1960 and raced at the first Armstrong 500, later to become famous as the Bathurst 1000, and won his class driving a Ford Customline.

Touring Cars
Carter emerged as a regular in the Australian Touring Car Championship in 1973. Driving Ford Falcons Carter was one of the leading privateer drivers during the 1970s and into the early 1980s. Famously Carter lent his Falcon to works driver Allan Moffat at the Adelaide International Raceway round of the 1973 Australian Touring Car Championship after Moffat's race car was stolen by joyriders. Carter was a beneficiary of the work being done by Moffat and the Ford works team, getting new developments quickly, keeping him at the forefront of Ford racers through the 1970s. A career highlight came in 1975 when Carter benefitted from a season where many front running drivers and teams had fraught campaigns and finished runner up to Colin Bond in the 1975 Australian Touring Car Championship. The other major result of this period was a third placing at the 1978 Bathurst 1000 with New Zealand open-wheel ace Graeme Lawrence as co-driver.

Into the 1980s Carter was left behind by Ford when it withdrew from racing leaving Carter, briefly (until the rise of Dick Johnson), as Australia's leading Ford touring car driver. By 1983 Carter was becoming increasingly frustrated with developing Falcons and having little reward and switched to a cheaper-to-run Mazda RX-7. Little result came of this and Carter briefly stepped away from racing following the demise of the Group C Touring Car category at the end of 1984.

In 1986 Carter returned with a Nissan Skyline DR30 RS, before returning to Ford with a Ford Sierra RS500 in 1988 with sponsorship from Netcomm Australia. During his Australian Touring Car Championship career Carter set a record for the most top three finishes without taking a win (20), a record which still stands as of 2017.

Murray Carter's last year in touring cars was in 1990 in a privately entered Ford Sierra RS500. Murray raced in four of the nine ATCC rounds but did not score a point. He did provide a spectacular moment in the closing minutes of the series' return to Phillip Island for the first time since 1977 when he drove his smoking Sierra into the pits, pulling up just before entering pit lane with the engine of his car on fire. He then joined with Matt Wacker in the Sierra for what would be his last Bathurst 1000 in 1990. During practice, Wacker had a collision with Peter Brock's Sierra being driven by his co-driver Andy Rouse in The Dipper which sent the #05 car up on two wheels and into the fence. The #14 Sierra would be a DNF after 116 laps.

Production Cars
By 1991 Carter had switched to production car racing, initially with a Nissan Pintara in the Australian Production Car Championship. He later raced a Nissan Pulsar and then a Mazda 626 in this series, with a highlight of finishing runner up to Phil Morriss in the 1994 Australian Production Car Championship. In 1997 Carter began racing a Nissan 200SX Turbo in the Australian GT Production Car Championship. In 1999 a Chevrolet Corvette C5 followed and Carter transitioned with it into the new Australian Nations Cup Championship in 2000. Carter raced only occasionally into the 2000s, driving his Corvette in state level racing as late as 2008. In 2011 Carter still races the Corvette occasionally at Victorian championship level as he approaches 80 years of age. In 2017 Murray relinquished his Cams racing licence, and in 2019,sold his beloved Corvette to a W.A. company.

Career results

Complete Australian Touring Car Championship results
(key) (Races in bold indicate pole position) (Races in italics indicate fastest lap)

Complete Phillip Island/Bathurst 500/1000 results

References

1931 births
Australian Touring Car Championship drivers
Living people
Racing drivers from Melbourne
Australian Endurance Championship drivers